Calvaro V (1986 – 1 October 2003) was a grey Holsteiner gelding sired in 1986. Competing in show jumping events with his Swiss rider Willi Melliger, Calvaro won two Olympic silver medals (1996, 2000) and four world championship medals.

After suffering a knee injury in 2001, Calvaro was retired to Melliger's stud farm in Neuendorf, Switzerland, in 2002. His health rapidly declined, and he died in September 2003. Prior to the horse's death, Melliger allowed him to be cloned.

Pedigree

References

1986 animal births
2003 animal deaths
Holsteiner horses
Horses in the Olympics
Individual male horses
Swiss show jumping horses